Relative strength is a ratio of a stock price performance to a market average (index) performance. It is used in technical analysis.

It is not to be confused with relative strength index.

To calculate the relative strength of a particular stock, divide the percentage change over some time period by the percentage change of a particular index over the same time period.

Relative Rotation Graph
Relative Rotation Graphs (RRG) show the relative strength and momentum of mood swings in the market compared to benchmarks. The "JdK RS-Ratio" (relative strength, RS)  was developed by Julius de Kempenaer, a sellside analyst in The Netherlands.

References

Technical analysis